The Billboard Global 200 is a chart that ranks the best-performing songs globally. Its data, published by Billboard magazine and compiled by MRC Data, is based on digital sales and online streaming from over 200 territories worldwide. Another similar chart is the Billboard Global Excl. US chart, which follows the same formula except it covers all territories excluding the US. The two charts launched on September 19, 2020.

On the Global 200, eleven singles reached number one in 2022. Nineteen artists reached the top of the chart, with sixteen—Gayle, Carolina Gaitán, Mauro Castillo, Adassa, Rhenzy Feliz, Diane Guerrero, Stephanie Beatriz, Glass Animals, Harry Styles, Kate Bush, Bizarrap, Quevedo, Blackpink, Sam Smith, Kim Petras, and 21 Savage—achieving their first number-one single. Blackpink scored two number-one singles, the only act to achieve multiple number ones in 2022. Harry Styles spent the most weeks at the top spot with 15 non-consecutive weeks at number one for his single "As It Was", which became the longest reigning number-one song in the chart's history.

On the Global Excl. US, eleven singles reached number one in 2022. Fourteen artists reached the top of the chart, with nine—Gayle, Glass Animals, Anitta, Harry Styles, Kate Bush, Bizarrap, Quevedo, Sam Smith and Kim Petras—achieving their first number-one single. Blackpink scored two number-one singles, the only act to achieve multiple number ones in 2022. Harry Styles spent the most weeks at the top spot with 13 non-consecutive weeks at number one for his single "As It Was", which became the longest reigning number-one song in the chart's history.

Chart history

See also 
 2022 in music
 List of Billboard 200 number-one albums of 2022
 List of Billboard Hot 100 number ones of 2022
 Billboard Year-End Global 200 singles of 2022

References

Global 200
2022